Sarah Mawe (1767-1846) was an English mineralogist of the 19th century, appointed to serve Queen Victoria in that capacity from 1837 to 1840.

Biography
Sarah Mawe was born Sarah Brown in Derby, England to the mineralogist Richard Brown. Sarah married her the mineralogist and dealer in minerals John Mawe in 1794 and he became her father's business partner, and took charge of the London mineral shop. "She became a highly competent mineral appraiser, purchaser, and identifier in her own right." The Mawe's shop on the Strand soon became extremely successful, and so they opened shops in Cheltenham and Matlock Bath. Sarah constructed her own collections of minerals, loaned as examples to James Sowerby for photographs to be used in Exotic Mineralogy (1811-1820) and British Mineralogy (1804-1817). The business in London was taken on by James Tennant who held Sarah's collection until it was sold in 1846.

References

1767 births
1846 deaths
British mineralogists
People from Derby